Andreas "Andi" Widhölzl (born 14 October 1976) is an Austrian former ski jumper. During his career, he won world championships and Olympic titles.

Career
Widhölzl began his World Cup ski-jumping career in 1993.  Between 1997 and 2000, he won two Olympic bronzes and two world championship medals, along with sixteen victories in World Cup events.  During this time came his victory in the 1999/2000 Four Hills Tournament.  During this season, he came second in the ski-jumping World Cup.  In the next five years, he won only one World Cup event, however, in 2005 he twice won the world championship with the Austrian National Team and a year later he was part of the Austrian Team that won the Team Olympic Gold Medal at the Winter Olympics.  In March 2008, following health problems, he ended his fifteen-year-long World Cup ski-jumping career.

Widhölzl was interested in ski-jumping from an early age, his interest coming from watching the sport on television.  At around this time he joined the Tyrolese Ski Federation and learnt to ski.  When he was seven years old, a school friend convinced him to join the Fieberbrunner Weitenjäger.  After a few years, Widhölzl earned his first success in the district and regional championships for his age group.

World Cup

Standings

Wins

Invalid ski jumping world record

 Not recognized! Crash at world record distance.

References

 FIS Newsflash 177 on Widhölzl's retirement announcement. 30 April 2008.
 

Austrian male ski jumpers
Olympic ski jumpers of Austria
Olympic gold medalists for Austria
Olympic bronze medalists for Austria
Ski jumpers at the 1998 Winter Olympics
Ski jumpers at the 2002 Winter Olympics
Ski jumpers at the 2006 Winter Olympics
Olympic medalists in ski jumping
FIS Nordic World Ski Championships medalists in ski jumping
Medalists at the 2006 Winter Olympics
Medalists at the 1998 Winter Olympics
1976 births
Living people
People from Kitzbühel District
Sportspeople from Tyrol (state)
20th-century Austrian people
21st-century Austrian people